Calthorpe  may refer to:

People
Calthorpe (surname)

Places
Calthorpe Broad, Norfolk, England
Calthorpe, Norfolk, England
Calthorpe, Oxfordshire, England

Other uses
Calthorpe cars, made in England up to 1928
Baron Calthorpe, extinct title in the Peerage of England
Calthorpe Clinic, abortion clinic in England
Calthorpe F.C., defunct football club from Birmingham, England

See also
Gough-Calthorpe family
Calthrop